Isabel Avellán (20 August 1933 – 20 September 2010) was an Argentine athlete. She competed in the women's discus throw at the 1956 Summer Olympics.

Biography
Avellán was born in 1933, and at the age of nineteen, she won the discus and the shot put events at the 1952 Argentine Championships. By 1954, she had become a three-time national champion in the discus throw.

At the 1955 Pan American Games in Mexico City, Avellán won the silver medal in the women's discus throw, setting a new national record. A year later, at the 1956 Summer Olympics in Melbourne, Avellán was the flag bearer for Argentina, becoming the first female flag bearer for the nation at the Olympics. Avellán competed in the women's discus throw at the Olympics, finishing in sixth place out of 22 participants.

Avellán also competed at multiple editions of the South American Championships in Athletics, winning gold in the discus in the 1956 Championships, and two golds, in the discus and shot put, at the 1958 Championships.

After moving to Australia with her husband, Avellán won the discus event at the 1960 Australian Athletics Championships.

References

External links
 

1933 births
2010 deaths
Athletes (track and field) at the 1956 Summer Olympics
Argentine female discus throwers
Olympic athletes of Argentina
Athletes (track and field) at the 1955 Pan American Games
Pan American Games medalists in athletics (track and field)
Pan American Games silver medalists for Argentina
Place of birth missing
Medalists at the 1955 Pan American Games
20th-century Argentine women